Merry Tales is a short volume with sketches by Mark Twain, published by Charles L. Webster and Company in March 1892.

Contents

"The Private History of a Campaign That Failed"
"The Invalid's Story"
"Luck"
"The Captain's Story"
"A Curious Experience"
"Mrs. Mc Williams and the Lightning"
"Meisterschaft"

The contents of Merry Tales, except "The Captain's Story", were reprinted as a section titled "Merry Tales" in The American Claimant and Other Stories and Sketches.

References

External links
Facsimile of first edition at OpenLibrary, also available for download in many ebook formats

Short story collections by Mark Twain
1892 short story collections